Buzzard Roost is an unincorporated community in Colbert County, Alabama. Buzzard Roost had a post office in the 1850s, but it no longer exists.

Geography
Buzzard Roost is located three miles west of Cherokee on U.S. Route 72.

History 
Bernard Romans' Map of 1772 indicated a place called "Chickianooe", which appears to be a misprint of the Choctaw word "Chickianoce," "Skeki anusi" or “anosi,” "meaning Buzzards there sleep."

Levi Colbert, Chickasaw Bench Chief, built his stand in Buzzard Roost in 1801. He ran an inn there with his family. An exhibit telling his story is part of the Natchez Trace Parkway. He is credited with changing the name from Buzzard Sleep to Buzzard Roost.

In the 1840s, Armstead Barton built Barton Hall, also known as the Cunningham Plantation, an antebellum plantation house.

Buzzard Roost Covered Bridge, built over Buzzard Roost Creek in 1860, was 94 ft. long, and located on "Allsboro Rd., which is part of the Natchez Trace Parkway System". It was destroyed by fire on July 15, 1972.

In 1958, a type of spear point dating from the Early to an early Middle Archaic period, the Buzzard Roost Creek Point, was named after a site on Buzzard Roost Creek, by James W. Cambron.

Buzzard Roost was added to the National Register of Historic Places November 7, 1976.

As of 2011, a Pratt pony truss bridge built over Buzzard Roost Creek in 1940 remains, although it is rated "structurally deficient."

References

External links 
Natchez Trace Parkway - Buzzard Roost Spring, near Cherokee, AL

Photographs of Buzzard Roost Spring
Buzzard Roost Covered Bridge 
Buzzard Roost Bridge, Bham Wiki
Riverton Rose Trail Buzzard Roost Creek Bridge

Unincorporated communities in Alabama
Unincorporated communities in Colbert County, Alabama
National Register of Historic Places in Colbert County, Alabama
Historic American Buildings Survey in Alabama
National Register of Historic Places in Alabama